Aaron Pott is a winemaker. Upon graduation from the University of California, Davis, he took a position at Newton Vineyard in Napa Valley. He left Newton for a position as winemaker at Château Troplong-Mondot, a Premier Grand Cru Classé in Saint-Émilion, France. Pott left Château Troplong Mondont after a year to become director at Château La Tour Figeac, a Grand Cru Classé located in Saint-Emilion. He spent five years there and in the process earned a degree in Viticulture from the Université de Bourgogne in Dijon, France. Pott returned to the United States after six years, becoming head winemaker in charge of international brands for Beringer Wine Estates of the Napa Valley. In 2004, he accepted a position as winemaker and general manager at Quintessa Estate in the Napa Valley.

In 2007, Pott teamed up with his wife Claire to create Pott Wine, a Napa Valley label, produced in part, from the couple’s  vineyard property on Mt. Veeder. He continues to consult to a limited number of Napa Valley producers, among them Blackbird Vineyards, Seven Stones Winery, Greer Wines, Perliss Vineyards, St. Helena Winery, Fe Vineyards..

Awards

2012, Winemaker of the Year, Food & Wine

References

External links
 Biography of Aaron at Pott Wine.

Living people
American winemakers
Year of birth missing (living people)
University of California, Davis alumni